Baltimore Bike Share (also referred to as Bmore Bikeshare) was a bicycle sharing system that served the city of Baltimore, Maryland. The system had more than 50 stations, all owned by the Baltimore City government, and operated in a public–private partnership with Bewegen Technologies and Corps Logistics. Launched in 2016, Baltimore Bike Share had the largest electrical-assisted cycling (Pedelec) fleet in North America.

On August 15, 2018, the Baltimore Bike Share system was cancelled at a cost of $3.2 million and shut down immediately due to on-going problems with the system. Replacing the Baltimore Bike Share are dockless scooters and bicycles from startup companies Bird and LimeBike.

Pricing
Baltimore Bike Share offered four pricing options: Founding Member ($100.00/year), Monthly Pass ($15.00/month), Go Pass ($2.00/trip), and Single-Trip. The first 45 minutes of each ride are included for Go Trip and Single-Trip Passholders. Rides that are longer than 45 minutes are subject to extended use charges ($2 per 30 minutes).

Stations
The network included 50 stations in Baltimore City: 22 fixed stations and 28 planned or temporary stations. Many of these stations were located along bicycle boulevards around the city. Several stations also linked to the transit lines of the Metro Subway and Light Rail, as well as regional rail lines operated by the MARC Train and Amtrak.

See also
Capital Bikeshare, bicycle sharing system for Washington, D.C.
Indego, bicycle sharing system for Philadelphia

References

External links
Official website

Community bicycle programs
Cycling in Maryland
Transportation in Baltimore
Bicycle sharing in the United States